The Skeptics' Guide to the Universe (SGU) is an American weekly skeptical podcast hosted by Steven Novella, MD, along with a panel of contributors. The official podcast of the New England Skeptical Society, it was named to evoke The Hitchhiker's Guide to the Galaxy. The show features discussions of recent scientific developments in layman's terms, and interviews authors, people in the area of science, and other famous skeptics. The SGU podcast includes discussions of myths, conspiracy theories, pseudoscience, the paranormal, and other forms of superstition, from the point of view of scientific skepticism.

Hosts
The SGU podcast was first released in May 2005. The original lineup of the podcast consisted of the Novella brothers, Steven Novella, Robert "Bob" Novella and Jay Novella, along with Evan Bernstein, and Perry DeAngelis. DeAngelis contributed until his death in 2007, shortly before his 44th birthday. Rebecca Watson joined in 2006 and later left the podcast in 2014. Cara Santa Maria joined the cast in July 2015.

The podcast is affiliated with the New England Skeptical Society and with the SGU Productions LLC.

Until 2018 there were no full-time employees of the podcast, although that was in part due to a defamation lawsuit filed by Edward Tobinick that consumed financial resources that would have otherwise been available. In 2018 Jay Novella, who had previously both been one of the cast and managed the podcast's website, was employed full-time as a result of reaching a Patreon target of 3,000 donors.

Production 

The show is prerecorded via a Skype conference call. Each caller records their own audio and then the individually recorded tracks are mixed together when Steven Novella edits the show in post-production. British comedian and skeptic Iszi Lawrence provides voice-over introductions for the show and certain segments.

Segments include interviews, discussions of significant but largely unknown figures in science, short games and puzzles played with the audience or between the panellists, and accounts of relevant events in the news that relate to skepticism. Shows last about 80 minutes, although on September 23, 2011, SGU produced a 24-hour-long podcast with contributions by skeptics from around the world. It was referred to as SGU-24.

Theme music 
The show's theme music is "Theorem" by the San Francisco rock band, Kineto. The theme was acquired from the Podsafe Music Network. Prior to the November 2, 2005 show, Thomas Dolby's "She Blinded Me with Science" was the show's theme.

Guests 

Many Skeptics' Guide episodes contain interviews. Often the interviews feature well-known scientists or skeptics, for instance Massimo Pigliucci or Joe Nickell. Rarely the guests are proponents of fringe or pseudoscientific views. Some episodes have guest rogues, such as Bill Nye, participating in the entire podcast. Notable guests include the following:

Recognition 
The Skeptics' Guide won the 2009 Podcast Awards in the "Education" category, and the 2010, 2011, 2012, and 2014 Podcast Awards in the "Science" category.

It was also a 2014 "Dose of Rationality" Top 10 Podcast, and a 2010 Physics.org Best Podcast nominee.

Sponsors and membership 
On July 30, 2013, Dr. Steven Novella announced that the SGU would begin offering membership and airing sponsors. Novella went on to say that the money raised would go into funding skeptical activities, including but not limited to, development of skeptical educational content and web-series such as "Occ The Skeptical Caveman". The addition of sponsors is not permanent, according to Novella, they shall be removed "if 4% of listeners support the SGU through membership at an average of the $8 per month level."
Though membership has begun, the SGU continues to publish a free weekly sponsored podcast. Membership entitles one to an ad-free version of The SGU, extra content, and discounts to NECSS (The Northeast Conference on Science and Skepticism). Membership range from $4/month to $200/month.

Additional financial support from listeners is provided through Patreon. The SGU has established several goals after achieving a certain number of financial supporters. A major benchmark was reached in 2018 with 3,000 Patreon supporters that sustained enough predictable income for a full-time employee. Other benchmarks include a 12-hour and 24-hour live show after reaching 4,000 and 5,500 supporters, respectively. These live shows may be located on the most complete and accurate reproduction of the Starship Enterprise Star Trek: The Original Series set, which was built by James Cawley and can be seen on the SGU Patreon page introduction video.

The Skeptics' Guide to the Universe book 

The Skeptics' Guide to the Universe: How to Know What's Really Real in a World Increasingly Full of Fake is a 2018 book written by Steven Novella and co-authored by the other current co-hosts of The Skeptics' Guide to the Universe podcast—Bob Novella, Cara Santa Maria, Jay Novella, and Evan Bernstein. It also contains posthumous material from former co-host Perry DeAngelis. The book is meant to be an all-encompassing guide to skeptical thinking. In an interview with The European Skeptics Podcast, Jay Novella describes their approach to writing the book from the "point of view of an alien species observing the earth from a skeptical perspective using critical thinking," reminiscent of the podcast's namesake The Hitchhiker's Guide to the Galaxy by Douglas Adams.

References

External links 

 
 New England Skeptical Society Homepage
 SGU Transcripts

Audio podcasts
Scientific skepticism mass media
Science podcasts
2005 podcast debuts
Patreon creators